Clark Township is one of the thirteen townships of Clinton County, Ohio, United States. The 2010 census reported 2,123 people living in the township, up from 1,861 people in 2000.

Geography
Located in the southern part of the county, it borders the following townships:
Washington Township - north
Green Township - northeast
Union Township, Highland County - southeast
Dodson Township, Highland County - south
Jefferson Township - southwest

The entire township lies in the Virginia Military District. Clinton County's "bootheel", the odd piece of land jutting into Highland County, added to bring Clinton County to the constitutionally mandated  area, is in the township.

The village of Martinsville is located in northern Clark Township.

Name and history
Statewide, other Clark Townships are located in Brown, Coshocton, and Holmes counties.

Government
The township is governed by a three-member board of trustees, who are elected in November of odd-numbered years to a four-year term beginning on the following January 1.  Two are elected in the year after the presidential election and one is elected in the year before it.  There is also an elected township fiscal officer, who serves a four-year term beginning on April 1 of the year after the election, which is held in November of the year before the presidential election.  The trustees and clerk are chosen in non-partisan elections.  Vacancies in the fiscal officership or on the board of trustees are filled by the remaining trustees.

References
Clinton County Historical Society.  Clinton County, Ohio, 1982.  Wilmington, Ohio:  The Society, 1982.
Ohio Atlas & Gazetteer.  6th ed. Yarmouth, Maine:  DeLorme, 2001.  
Ohio. Secretary of State.  The Ohio municipal and township roster, 2002-2003.  Columbus, Ohio:  The Secretary, 2003.

External links
County website

Townships in Clinton County, Ohio
Townships in Ohio